JR Motorsports (pronounced "Junior Motorsports") is an American professional stock car racing team that currently competes in the NASCAR Xfinity Series, eNASCAR Coca-Cola iRacing Series, CARS Tour, and occasionally in the NASCAR Advance Auto Parts Weekly Series. The team is based in Mooresville, North Carolina, co-owned by former NASCAR Cup Series driver Dale Earnhardt Jr., his sister Kelley Earnhardt Miller, Kelley’s husband and former racer L.W. Miller, and the owner of his former Cup Series team, Rick Hendrick. As of 2022, the team fields four full-time entries in the Xfinity Series: the No. 1 Chevrolet Camaro SS full-time for Sam Mayer, the No. 7 Camaro full-time for Justin Allgaier, the No. 8 Camaro full-time for Josh Berry, and the No. 9 Camaro full-time for Brandon Jones. The team also fields the No. 88 Camaro part-time for Miguel Paludo and team owner Dale Earnhardt Jr..

History

JR Motorsports began in a shed on the property of Dale Earnhardt, Inc. in 1998 with just one employee, as the marketing division of Dale Earnhardt Jr.'s race team. The original intent of the business was to help Earnhardt Jr. sell T-shirts and negotiate sponsorship deals. It wasn't until 2002 that Earnhardt Jr. turned the business into a race team when T. J. Majors drove street stock division at Concord Motorsport Park in North Carolina. Upon Earnhardt Jr.'s signing with Hendrick Motorsports, the Hendrick and JR Motorsports Nationwide Series teams were merged.

The first win for the team came at Motor Mile Speedway in Radford, VA, in 2004. (At the time, Earnhardt Jr. was co-owner of another racing venture, Chance 2 Motorsports.) JR Motorsports in its current form, competing in the NASCAR Xfinity Series started in 2006 when sponsorship from the United States Navy funded the team. The team originally wanted to open in 2007, but the Navy sponsorship accelerated the operations.

Today, the team operates out of a  race shop near Mooresville, North Carolina.

In early 2019 it was announced that JR Motorsports had formed a driver development program with GMS Racing, Drivers Edge Development, to train young drivers. Drivers in the program would race in JR Motorsports' Late Model and NASCAR Xfinity Series teams, as well as GMS Racing's NASCAR K&N Pro Series, ARCA Menards Series, and NASCAR Gander Outdoors Truck Series teams. JR Motorsports drivers Noah Gragson, Zane Smith, Sam Mayer, and Adam Lemke were among the inaugural members of the program.

On April 11, 2021, Earnhardt Jr. hinted that JR Motorsports may move up to the Cup Series, given the proposed savings associated with the debut of the Next Gen car in 2022. The challenges for the team are acquiring a charter and securing sponsorship for a Cup program.

On August 24, 2022, Director of Competition Ryan Pemberton parted ways with JR Motorsports after working with the team since 2012. On September 1, Mike Bumgarner was announced as Pemberton's replacement.

Xfinity Series

Car No. 1 history

Elliott Sadler (2016–2018)
It was announced in late 2015 that Elliott Sadler would drive the new No. 1 OneMain Financial Chevy, replacing Chase Elliott as he moved up to take over the No. 24 replacing Jeff Gordon.  Sadler started the season with a fourth-place finish in the season opener at Daytona. He would win three races in 2016 and ended up finishing second in the overall standings after a controversial restart with less than ten laps remaining at Homestead that cost Sadler and his teammate, Justin Allgaier, a shot to win the title. In 2017, Sadler didn't win a race but ended up finishing 2nd in points behind only teammate William Byron.

Michael Annett (2019–2021)

On September 25, 2018, Noah Gragson was announced as the new driver of the No. 1 after Sadler announced his retirement earlier that year; However, on January 25, 2019, it was announced that Michael Annett would drive the No. 1 car with the points from the 5 car going over to the 1 car while Gragson would drive the No. 9 car. Annett scored his first career victory at Daytona International Speedway in the NASCAR Racing Experience 300. Annett returned to JRM in 2020 and qualified for the playoffs. He was eliminated after the first round. In July 2021, Annett missed the races at Atlanta and New Hampshire due to a stress fracture in his right femur. Austin Dillon served as his replacement in the No. 1 for Atlanta, while Josh Berry did so for New Hampshire. On October 6, 2021, Annett announced his retirement from Full Time racing.

Sam Mayer (2022–present)
Sam Mayer was announced the new full-time driver of the No. 1 on January 4, 2022. He started the season with a 30th place finish at Daytona and scored four top-five finishes in the first 10 races. On May 3, crew chief Taylor Moyer was suspended for four races due to a tire and wheel loss at Dover. Andrew Overstreet was announced as the crew chief of the No. 1 for Darlington.

On August 9, 2022, it was announced that Mayer would return for the 2023 season.

No. 1 results

Car No. 5 history

Multiple drivers (2008–2009)
The No. 5 car joined in 2008 as part of the merger with Hendrick Motorsports' Nationwide teams. It was driven by Jimmie Johnson, Dale Earnhardt Jr., Martin Truex Jr., Mark Martin, Landon Cassill, Ron Fellows and Adrian Fernandez, with sponsorship from Lowe's (Johnson and Fernandez), National Guard (Truex Jr, Earnhardt Jr and Cassill), Delphi, (Martin) and Godaddy.com (Earnhardt Jr and Fellows). The No. 5 car won two races in 2008, with Martin at Las Vegas and Ron Fellows in Montreal, the first NASCAR race run in the rain.

The 5 car returned in 2009 with sponsorship from Fastenal, GoDaddy.com, Unilever and Delphi. The team's best finish was a third with Earnhardt Jr at Atlanta.

Part-time (2011–2012)

In 2011, the 5 car returned as JR Motorsports' 3rd entry, with Dale Earnhardt Jr. and Ron Fellows running a handful of races part-time. The car returned in 2012 once more with Dale Jr. and Fellows driving, and Regan Smith would win the Ford 300 after announcing his addition to the team. Ron Fellows would nearly win a few races at Road America in 2011 & 2012, and then at Watkins Glen in 2012 before running one last race for the team in the inaugural race at Mid-Ohio Sports Car Course in 2013. Fellows would part ways with the team at year's end, due to a sponsor conflict related to NAPA Auto Parts joining the team for 2014.

Kasey Kahne and Brad Sweet (2013)
The car was originally slated for Smith in 2013, but he was moved to the No. 7 when Jr's Cup teammate Kasey Kahne and USAC driver Brad Sweet signed to drive the No. 5 with sponsorship from Great Clips.

Multiple drivers (2014–2016)
On Monday, October 14, 2013, JR Motorsports announced that Kevin Harvick would begin driving the No. 5 car in at least 12 races for the 2014 season. In four of the races, the car was sponsored by Hunt Brothers Pizza. Super Late Model driver Austin Theriault drove the car in a three races for the team starting at Iowa. JR development driver Josh Berry drove two races starting at Iowa in August. For 2015, the No. 5 was driven by Kahne in a single race at Charlotte as a 4th team car, where he finished 3rd.

Michael Annett (2017–2018)

Michael Annett drove the car full-time in 2017 with Pilot Flying J as the sponsor en route to a 9th-place finish in the standings as well as earning a career-best 2nd-place finish at Road America.

On January 25, 2019, it was announced that Annett would be piloting the No. 1 car with the points from the 5 car going over to the 1 car with the 5 car being shut down.

No. 5 results

Car No. 7 history

Multiple Drivers (2010–2012)
The team fielded the No. 7 with Danica Patrick driving about 12 races for JR Motorsports with GoDaddy.com sponsorship in 2010. The remainder of the schedule was filled out with Scott Wimmer, Dale Earnhardt Jr., Landon Cassill, Steve Arpin, Josh Wise and J. R. Fitzpatrick. Patrick recorded a best finish of 4th at Las Vegas. Wise returned to the team for 2011, recording three top tens and one top-five in fourteen starts. Earnhardt Jr. drove the car at Talladega, and Cup drivers Jimmie Johnson, Kasey Kahne and Jamie McMurray drove the car for a combined six starts that season.

Danica Patrick (2012)
Danica Patrick returned to the No. 7 in 2012, this time running a full schedule with sponsorship from GoDaddy, Tissot, and Hot Wheels. Patrick departed JR Motorsports to compete full-time in the Cup Series for the 2013 season.

Regan Smith (2013–2015)
Regan Smith, a former teammate to Dale Earnhardt Jr. at DEI who served as his substitute driver in the Cup Series late in 2012, was signed to drive for the team in 2013. Initially announced to drive the No. 5 car, he would be moved to the No. 7. Smith won twice at Talladega and Michigan, but suffered a run of bad luck in the summer and finished third in points. In 2014, Regan Smith returned to drive the No. 7 car, starting the season with a win in the DRIVE4COPD 300 at Daytona. From there, he would go on to help JRM complete a one-two points finish behind Chase Elliott. In 2015, Regan Smith returned to the No. 7 full-time. He also gained two victories including Mid-Ohio and Dover. Following the Kansas race, Smith stated that he will not return for JR Motorsports in 2016.

Justin Allgaier (2016–present)
Justin Allgaier would be later announced to be the new driver of the No. 7 Chevy, bringing sponsorship from BRANDT. After finishing the 2016 season 3rd in the final standings while going winless, he picked up two wins at Phoenix and Chicagoland in 2017 en route to another 3rd-place finish in the standings. In 2018, Allgaier had a career-best season winning 5 races at Dover, Iowa, Road America, Mid-Ohio, and Indianapolis while also clinching the regular-season championship, but he ended up finishing 7th in the final standings after being eliminated in the round of 8. At the second-to-last race of the 2019 season at Phoenix, Allgaier had possibly been set to finish 2nd for the sixth time of the year until he suddenly witnessed race leader Christopher Bell getting flagged for speeding on pit road at the end of Stage 2, nabbing his 1st victory of the season and 3rd Championship 4 appearance in the last four years after leading 85 laps. He finished 4th in the final points standings after finishing 14th at Homestead. In 2020 Allgaier rebounded from a sluggish first half of the season to win 3 races at Dover and sweeping the Richmond races. He would make the final four and would finish 2nd in points to Austin Cindric. In 2021 he won twice early in the season at Atlanta and Darlington and finished the season fifth in points. In 2022, Allgaier ended a 34-race winless streak at Darlington. He would also win at Nashville and New Hampshire.

No. 7 results

Car No. 8 history

Multiple drivers (2019–2021)
The No. 8, long driven by Earnhardt Jr. during his early Cup career with Dale Earnhardt, Inc., became a JRM number in 2019 after acquiring it from B. J. McLeod Motorsports. The team inherited the No. 1 car points and it was shared by Zane Smith, Brett Moffitt, Jeb Burton, Ryan Truex, Ryan Preece, Regan Smith, and Sheldon Creed. Elliott and Earnhardt returned to the car for one-off races at Daytona and Darlington, respectively. For 2020, Jeb Burton, Dale Earnhardt Jr., and Daniel Hemric all share the No. 8 for 2020 with Hemric doing a majority of the driving.
For 2021, Sam Mayer was scheduled to drive the No. 8 car part-time in the latter portion of 2021. For the first half of the season, Josh Berry is scheduled to drive the No. 8 car for 12 races while Miguel Paludo drive for 3 road-course races.

Josh Berry (2021–present)
After driving the No. 8 car for 12 races in 2021, on August 16, 2021, it was announced that Josh Berry will drive the car full-time in 2022. He began the season with a 16th place finish at Daytona. Berry scored wins at Dover and Charlotte to make the playoffs. During the playoffs, he won at Las Vegas to make the Championship 4.

No. 8 results

Car No. 9 history

Chase Elliott (2014–2015)
The No. 9 car made its debut in 2014, when an 18-year-old Hendrick development driver named Chase Elliott was signed to drive a fourth entry for JR Motorsports. The car was renumbered to 9, the longtime number of Chase's father Bill Elliott. In a surprise move, NAPA Auto Parts, which recently left Michael Waltrip Racing and was rumored to depart from the sport, signed on to sponsor the full season. After the Boyd Gaming 300 at Las Vegas Motor Speedway, the team was revealed to have violated Sections 12–4.2 (P2 penalty) and 20A–12.8.1B (car exceeded minimum front height) of the NASCAR rulebook. As a result, crew chief Greg Ives was placed on probation until December 31. At the O'Reilly Auto Parts 300, Elliott passed teammate Kevin Harvick for his first Nationwide Series win. Elliott's second win came in the VFW Sport Clips Help a Hero 200 at Darlington Raceway, where he led 52 laps. A late race caution and a slow pit stop would find Elliott restarting in 6th with just 2 laps to go. Elliott managed an outstanding feat of passing the 5 cars in front of him en route to his second win of the season. Elliott would win his third race of the season in the EnjoyIllinois.com 300 at Chicagoland Speedway after holding off Trevor Bayne. Elliott won the 2014 Nationwide Series championship, the first rookie to win a NASCAR national series championship.

In 2015, Elliott returned to the No. 9 full-time to defend his championship, but only won one race at Richmond and finished 2nd in the final standings. Elliott's 2014 crew chief Greg Ives would move up to Dale Earnhardt Jr.'s Cup Series team, replaced by longtime Xfinity crew chief Ernie Cope. The No. 9 team did not race in 2016.

William Byron (2017)

On August 18, 2016, William Byron and Hendrick Motorsports announced a multi-year driver development agreement, with Byron running full-time in the Xfinity Series driving the No. 9 Liberty University Chevrolet Camaro for JR Motorsports in 2017. It was the first time since 2014 that the No. 9 was driven by a rookie driver. At the 2017 Ford Eco Boost 300, as William Byron and Elliott Sadler were battling late, Byron took advantage of Sadler's mistake of trying to pass Ryan Preece when he was too far back, slowing Sadler and allowing Byron to pass both drivers. When Sadler tried to follow, he made contact with Preece, sending Preece sideways and Sadler into the wall. After that Byron pulled away and finished 3rd, ultimately winning the championship and Rookie of the Year honors while winning four races at Iowa, Daytona, Indianapolis, and Phoenix.

Tyler Reddick (2018)

Tyler Reddick was signed to a full-time schedule for the 2018 Xfinity season, replacing William Byron, who was promoted to the Monster Energy NASCAR Cup Series. On February 17, 2018, Reddick beat teammate Elliott Sadler in a photo finish to win the season-opening race at Daytona. At a margin of .0004 seconds, it is the closest finish in NASCAR history. At the Ford EcoBoost 300, Reddick took advantage of pitting while leader Cole Custer stayed longer than him and won the race while also winning the championship, joining Chase Elliott and William Byron as the third different driver to win the championship and Rookie of the Year honors in the No. 9. Despite winning the championship, Reddick opted to leave JRM for Richard Childress Racing in 2019, winning his second Xfinity championship that year before jumping to the Cup Series in 2020.

Noah Gragson (2019–2022)

On December 18, 2018, it was announced that the No. 9 car would be driven by Zane Smith for eight races while other drivers fill out the other 25 races; however, on January 25, 2019, it was announced that Noah Gragson would drive the No. 9 car full-time while Smith will run 8 races in the new No. 8 entry. In his first year with JRM, Gragson scored no wins, but had six top-fives and 22 top-10s while finishing eighth in the points standings.

Gragson began the 2020 season with his first career win at Daytona. He also scored his second victory at Bristol. In addition, Gragson recorded 17 top-fives and 25 top-10s, finishing fifth in the points standings.

The 2021 season for Gragson began with a 32nd place finish at Daytona. His run that season was marred by six DNFs, but back-to-back wins at Darlington and Richmond put him in the playoffs for the third season in a row. Gragson won again at Martinsville and finished the season third in the standings.

Gragson began the 2022 season with a third-place finish at Daytona. He also scored wins at Phoenix, Talladega, and Pocono. At Road America, Gragson had an on-road scuffle with Sage Karam, resulting in him triggering a 13-car pileup on lap 25. He was fined 35,000 and docked 30 driver and owner points for the incident. On August 10, 2022, it was announced that Gragson would leave JRM to go drive the Petty GMS Motorsports No. 42 in the NASCAR Cup Series. At the September Darlington race, Gragson won a three-car battle with Sheldon Creed and Kyle Larson on the closing laps. He also won the next three races at Kansas, Bristol, and Texas, becoming the first driver since Sam Ard in 1983 to win four straight Xfinity Series races. Gragson won at Homestead to make his second Championship 4 appearance.

Brandon Jones (2023–)
On September 14, 2022, it was announced that Brandon Jones would depart Joe Gibbs Racing and replace Gragson in the No. 9 for 2023. Jones' sponsor Menards confirmed they would follow him for the full 2023 season.

No. 9 results

Car No. 83 history

Part-time (2006, 2008)
In 2006, the team fielded the No. 83 team as a part-time second car. The car was driven by Shane Huffman with sponsorship from the Make a Wish Foundation. The car returned in 2008 driven by Dale Earnhardt Jr. with the US Navy sponsoring. In 2010, JR Motorsports and Richard Childress Racing announced that the number would switch from No. 83 to No. 3 with Dale Earnhardt Jr. driving the car at Daytona in July with Wrangler sponsoring the car. This was a tribute to Dale Earnhardt, being inducted into the NASCAR Hall of Fame in May. Earnhardt Jr. won the race in the No. 3 car.

No. 83 results

Car No. 88 history

Multiple Drivers (2005-2007)
The No. 88 debuted in 2005 at the Ford 300 with Mark McFarland driving with sponsorship from the United States Navy, qualifying eighteenth and finishing twentieth. McFarland was named the full-time driver and had a seventh-place finish at Talladega Superspeedway, but was replaced by Shane Huffman after twenty-one races, with Martin Truex Jr. and Robby Gordon filling-in for certain races. Huffman was hired as the full-time driver in 2007, and had two top-ten finishes before he was released from the ride as well.

Brad Keselowski (2007–2009)

Brad Keselowski, son of former Craftsman Truck Series driver Bob Keselowski, was hired to replace Huffman for three races, with SCCA driver Andy Pilgrim to be in the car for the road course races in Montreal and Watkins Glen. Keselowski then returned at his hometown track Michigan. He was involved in a hard crash at Fontana, in which he was tagged by a spinning car, collided head first and then driver side with the turn 1 wall, temporarily was airborne, and then rode the guardrail while his car was on fire before coming to a stop. Keselowski was taken to a local hospital, and was later cleared to race at Richmond the next week. Keselowski finished the season with five top-ten finishes
Keselowski signed a two-year contract with JR Motorsports with the Navy returning as sponsor in 2008. He won his first race at Nashville Superspeedway and later picked up another win at Bristol Motor Speedway, finishing third in points but lost the Navy sponsorship for 2009. GoDaddy.com and Delphi Corporation sponsored the No. 88 for a total of 24 races in 2009, with Unilever brands sponsoring 11 races on the No. 88 car. Keselowski won four races and finished third in points for the second consecutive season before leaving for Penske Racing.

Multiple drivers (2010)
At the end of the 2009 season, Kelly Bires signed a two-year contract to drive for JR Motorsports in the No. 88 Chevy through 2011, with Earnhardt eager to see what Bires could do in his equipment. Bires drove the No. 5 Ragu Chevy for Junior at Homestead in preparation for running full-time in 2010. Due to sponsorship obligations with Unilever and their Hellmann's Mayonnaise brand, owner Dale Earnhardt Jr. ran the No. 88 car at the 2010 season opener at Daytona and Danica Patrick ran the No. 7 car with her sponsor GoDaddy.com, forcing Bires to sit out. In his debut at Fontana, Bires scored a seventh-place finish. Even more curious than his missing Daytona was when Bires was removed from the No. 88 car in favor of Cup driver Jamie McMurray after only five races run, with only one finish below 17th (a crash at Las Vegas). Earnhardt Jr. cited chemistry issues between Bires, JR Motorsports management, and the team including Tony Eury Sr. and Jr., and implied that Bires was taking a seat from "the next Brad Keselowski, the next Jeff Gordon." Bires was the third young driver to be hastily removed from the 88 car. Elliott Sadler, Greg Sacks, Aric Almirola, Steve Arpin, Coleman Pressley, Dale Earnhardt Jr. and Ron Fellows all ran races in the car to finish out the season. The No. 88 team took home one win in 2010, with McMurray victorious in the Great Clips 300 at Atlanta. They also came close to winning the inaugural race at Road America with Ron Fellows.

Aric Almirola (2010–2011)
Former DEI development driver Aric Almirola moved up from the Truck Series to drive the car full-time in 2011 as a part of a 2-year deal. With sponsorship from Unilever, Grand Touring Vodka, and TaxSlayer, Almirola ended up fourth in points in his first full-time season.

Cole Whitt (2012)
Almirola then left JRM after 2011 to join Richard Petty Motorsports in the Cup Series, while the No. 88 was taken by former Red Bull development driver Cole Whitt in 2012 for his rookie season. Whitt had a consistent rookie season despite switching crew chiefs from Tony Eury Sr. to Bruce Cook. Whitt recorded a best finish of 4th at Daytona, Talladega, and Michigan, finishing 7th in the point standings but lost the Rookie of the Year battle to Austin Dillon.

Part-time (2013–2014)

With the team unable to find sponsorship for Whitt for 2013, the No. 88 was used by Dale Jr. in his limited Nationwide Series schedule (to keep consistency with his Cup Series number).

Multiple Drivers (2015-2016)
Dale Jr. and Kevin Harvick drove the car for the first two races of the 2014 season before switching the owner's points to the No. 5. In 2015 the No. 5 team became the No. 88 team, and was driven by Dale Jr. in 4 races, Kevin Harvick in 12 races, Kasey Kahne in 7 races, and Ben Rhodes in 10 races. On April 23, 2016, Dale Earnhardt Jr. piloted the No. 88 to victory at Richmond International Raceway, his first Xfinity win in six years and first with JR Motorsports.

Part Time (2017-2018)
It was announced in late-2016 that the No. 88 would be downgraded to a part-time ride for 2017 for Earnhardt Jr. and Kahne.

Chase Elliott drove the No. 88 in the 2018 season opening race at Daytona. Despite being black flagged after losing a window, he still managed to finish 12th. Earnhardt Jr. raced the car at the Federated Auto Parts 250 in Richmond, where he led a race-high 96 laps before finishing in fourth place. Impressed by his finish, Earnhardt Jr. said he will try to run another race in the 2019 season.

Part-time (2022–present)
With Josh Berry driving the 8 full-time in 2022, Earnhardt Jr. opened a fifth part-time entry for himself at Martinsville and for Miguel Paludo at three of the road courses. Three Hendrick Motorsports drivers: Chase Elliott, William Byron, and Kyle Larson drove the No. 88 at select races. Elliott did not qualify for the Darlington spring race, which marked the first time that team did not qualify. Byron finished second at Texas and 26th at New Hampshire. Larson won at Watkins Glen after Byron (driving the Hendrick Motorsports No. 17 entry) and Ty Gibbs spun off-course while fighting for the lead during the final restart.

No. 88 results

Camping World Truck Series

Truck No. 00 history

Multiple Drivers (2015)
On January 12, 2015, JR Motorsports announced that Haas Racing Development driver Cole Custer would drive a truck for the team in 10 races in 2015, marking the team's first foray into the Camping World Truck Series. Trucks were acquired from former Hendrick development partner Turner Scott Motorsports after that team ceased operations. The team operated out of a satellite facility in Mooresville, North Carolina. The truck's number (No. 00) and sponsor (Haas Automation) both came with the team from Haas Racing.Under NASCAR's age requirement rules for the Truck Series, the 17-year-old Custer ran 10 races, all at tracks under  in length (and Gateway Motorsports Park), with the team planning a full-time run in 2016 for the championship.  Kasey Kahne, Kevin Harvick, Kyle Larson, Alex Bowman, and Jeb Burton also ran races in the No. 00 truck. The No. 00 ran 15 races, winning twice: with Kahne at Charlotte in May, and with Custer at Gateway in June.

Cole Custer (2016)
In 2016, Custer went full time in the No. 00 and won the pole at Canadian Tire Motorsports Park, and looked to be the truck to beat. After leading the most laps, it seemed as though Custer would score his first win of the season and a spot in the inaugural chase, until John Hunter Nemechek put Custer into the grass and into the fence to win the race. After the race, Custer tackled Nemechek to the ground and was soon separated by NASCAR officials. No fines or penalties would be handed out to either driver.

In early January 2017, JRM announced the end of their participation in truck racing - to focus fully on their Xfinity Series entries.

No. 00 results

Truck No. 49 history
In 2016, the team fielded a second truck numbered 49 for Nick Drake, like Cole Custer a Haas Racing Development driver, beginning at Dover. The entry was fielded in a collaboration with Premium Motorsports, a fellow Truck Series team which normally runs the No. 49. Drake's paint scheme is similar to Cole Custer's, with the same Haas Automation sponsorship. In Drake's first career start at Dover, he finished a solid 16th. Drake made his second start at Iowa Speedway. The truck did not make any other starts with JR Motorsports equipment. Like the No. 00, the No. 49 was shut down due to sponsor Haas Automation leaving the team.

Truck No. 71 history
In 2016, JR Motorsports entered a second truck in collaboration with Contreras Motorsports for Chase Elliott in the Texas Roadhouse 200 at Martinsville Speedway
with NAPA and Valvoline as co-sponsors. Elliott started on the pole and led 109 of 200 laps before finishing in 2nd.

Cup Series speculation

During a press conference at Lowe's Motor Speedway on May 16, 2008, Earnhardt stated that once the Nationwide (now Xfinity) Series started using the Car of Tomorrow chassis, which debuted in July 2010 at the Daytona International Speedway, his Nationwide teams would possibly leave the series, due to the costs of switching cars.  When asked if he would move JR Motorsports to the Sprint Cup Series, Earnhardt said that due to the Xfinity Series and Sprint Cup Series almost having the same expensive costs, he might move the team to the Sprint Cup Series as early as 2009 "if the right opportunity comes along with the right sponsorship and driver...". However, JR Motorsports did not end up moving their team to Sprint Cup and has remained in the Xfinity and Camping World Truck Series, partially due to NASCAR's Cup Series limit of four cars per team owner. Because Rick Hendrick has an ownership stake in JR Motorsports and already fields the maximum of four cars with Hendrick Motorsports, JR Motorsports cannot field an entry in the Cup Series without Hendrick releasing his interest in the team. However, on April 11, 2021, Earnhardt Jr. hinted that JR Motorsports may move up to the Cup Series, given the proposed savings associated with the debut of the Next-Gen car in 2022. The challenges for the team are acquiring a charter, not continuing their professional relationship with Rick Hendrick (as a JRM Cup team with Hendrick's involvement would max out the four-car limit of Hendrick Motorsports), and securing sponsorship for a Cup program.

Other racing series

ARCA Menards Series
JRM has competed in six ARCA Racing Series events. Landon Cassill made the team debut in 2008 driving the No. 88 Chevrolet at Daytona and finished 7th. He returned at Talladega but finished 39th due to a crash.

The team would not compete in 2009 but returned for the 2010 ARCA Racing Series' season. Danica Patrick drove the No. 7 car at Daytona and finished 6th.

The team did not run between 2011 and 2014 but returned in 2015 with Cole Custer behind the wheel of the No. 00 Chevrolet. Custer made the pole position and led 15 laps but finished 5th at New Jersey Motorsports Park. He returned at the first Pocono race but finished 24th due to an axle problem. He then returned for the second Pocono race, started 5th, and won the race, after leading 18 laps. That win was the first and only win of JR Motorsports in ARCA. That race also was the last of the team in ARCA.

CARS Tour/NASCAR Advanced Auto Parts Weekly Series
JR Motorsports has fielded a regional late model program since 2002.

JR Motorsports fields the No. 88 Chevrolet driven by Josh Berry and various other drivers in Late Models. Berry, who has driven for JRM since 2010, captured the 2012 Motor Mile Speedway championship in the NASCAR Advance Auto Parts Weekly Series, the first championship for JRM at any level, running 18 races while collecting 6 poles and 15 top 5 finishes. Berry scored a second track championship at Hickory Motor Speedway in 2014. William Byron scored a single victory to finish runner up to Berry for the NASCAR-sanctioned track championship at Hickory. Pierce, who finished second in his Camping World Truck Series debut in the Mudsummer Classic at Eldora Speedway during the 2015 season, made his debut with JRM that year at Hickory Motor Speedway.

Christian Eckes ran the No. 1 Chevrolet for the 2016 season finishing 4th in the championship behind Berry in 3rd.

Anthony Alfredo was the Late Model development driver for the 2017 CARS Tour season, running the No. 8, and would go on to win two races and finish a close second in the championship to teammate Josh Berry.

On January 18, 2018, JRM announced the replacement of Anthony Alfredo, who announced the same day that he was moving to the K&N Series with MDM Motorsports, with 14-year-old Sam Mayer, which later on that year made his K&N Series debut and drove for MDM in his third race in the K&N Series. On August 4, 2018, Mayer will drive the 28 and Berry will drive the 73 for the throwback weekend at Hickory Motor Speedway. Mayer went on to collect one win and finish 5th in the standings behind Berry in 4th in his No. 8 Chevrolet.

Adam Lemke ran the new No. 98 in 2019 and unfortunately struggled for most of the season and finished 9th in the standings and missed two races.

Connor Mosack ran the No. 98 in the final race of 2019 and would go on to run full-time in 2020 at first in the No. 8 but would start running the No. 88 after Berry focused on an Advance Auto Parts Weekly Series National Championship, he finished 6th in the standings.

William Cox III was announced to run for JR Motorsports full-time in the CARS Tour for 2021, however he was released 4 races in and was replaced by Conner Jones for majority of the remaining races. Josh Berry ran a few late model races also in 2021.

Carson Kvapil, son of former NASCAR Camping World Truck Series champion Travis Kvapil, will run the No. 8 full-time in 2022 after closing the 2021 season for the team.

JRM's late model program has fielded rides for current NASCAR spotter T. J. Majors and Jeremy McGrath. It is currently overseen by Kelley Earnhardt Miller's husband, L. W. Miller.

Speed 1
In 2007, JR Motorsports supplied cars for Speed Channel's NASCAR coverage. The Speed 1 fleet for NASCAR RaceDay included a superspeedway car, and car for intermediate tracks, and a Car of Tomorrow. Speed 1 was driven by Hermie Sadler.

References

External links
 
 
 Interview with Dale Earnhardt Jr. & Brad Keselowski by Joshua Hudson, July 2008, G.I. Jobs Magazine
 Dale Jr.

2002 establishments in North Carolina
American auto racing teams
Companies based in North Carolina
Dale Earnhardt Jr.
NASCAR teams
ARCA Menards Series teams